Thomas Schrefl (born 26 March 1965 in Sankt Pölten) is an Austrian physicist. He is currently Head of the Center for Modelling and Simulation at the
Danube University Krems. He is also Head of the Christian Doppler Research Laboratory for Magnet Design in collaboration with Toyota. Previously he was Professor of Communications & Simulation Engineering at the St. Pölten University of Applied Sciences. Between 2004 and 2008 he was Professor of Functional Materials at the University of Sheffield. From 2000 to 2006, he led the micromagnetism group at the Vienna University of Technology.
In 2005, Dr. Schrefl delivered the Wohlfarth memorial lecture. His research interests include micromagnetic simulations, intelligent materials such as nano-sensors, high frequency oscillators, and atomic trap devices for medical applications.

Prof. Dr. Dipl.-Ing. Thomas Schrefl has co-authored more than 140 refereed scientific papers.

Awards
1999: START-Prize, Austrian Science Fund

References

External links
http://www.suessco.com/ 
https://web.archive.org/web/20071215102348/http://www.shef.ac.uk/materials/staff/tschrefl.html 
http://www.start-portal.at/die-starter/y132/index.html  (START Price of the Austrian Science fund.)
http://magnet.atp.tuwien.ac.at/ 
http://www.advancedmagnetics.net/ 
http://www.fhstp.ac.at/studium/technologie/computersimulation/studiengangsteam/schrefl

1965 births
Living people
Academic staff of University for Continuing Education Krems
Austrian physicists
People from Sankt Pölten
Academics of the University of Sheffield
Academic staff of TU Wien